Pirgula is a genus of moths in the subfamily Lymantriinae. The genus was erected by Tessmann in 1921.

Species
Some species are:
Pirgula atrinotata (Butler, 1897) Tanzania
Pirgula delicata Griveaud, 1973 Madagascar
Pirgula delosema Collenette, 1953 Rhodesia
Pirgula gracillima (Holland, 1893)
Pirgula jordani (Hering, 1926) Madagascar
Pirgula melanoma Collenette, 1936 Madagascar
Pirgula monopunctata Griveaud, 1973 Madagascar
Pirgula octoguttata (Tessmann, 1921) Cameroons
Pirgula polylopha Collenette, 1959 Madagascar
Pirgula polyopha Collenette, 1959
Pirgula quinquepunctata (Wichgraf, 1921) Tanzania
Pirgula sexpunctata Griveaud, 1973 Madagascar
Pirgula stictogonia Collenette, 1936 Angola

References

Lymantriinae